The People's Park is the largest public park in Waterford city, Ireland. Laid out in the 19th century, it is 6.6 hectares (16.3 acres) in size. It is located at the junction of the Park Road and William Street. The site of the People's Park was originally a marshland which John's River ran through, however in 1857 the river was diverted and the marshland drained to make way for the construction of the park.

The park contains a Victorian-era bandstand, the Goff cycle track, a children's playground, a spherical monument and water feature and an old painted iron bridge connecting the park to the grounds of the Court House. The park has been renovated and upgraded in recent years. The old caretaker's house was renovated and a small extension added with the Park Lodge café now occupying the structure. A baby playground area was also built. In July 2006, €1 million funding was announced for additional refurbishment.

In May 2011, the Victorian bandstand was vandalised, with the structure pulled down and many of the ornate wrought iron railings surrounding it being damaged. Gardaí later arrested several people on suspicion that they may have been responsible. The damage was promptly repaired by the engineering department of Waterford City Council.

References

Bibliography

Geography of Waterford (city)
Parks in County Waterford